An urban area or  in Sweden has a minimum of 200 inhabitants and may be a city, town or larger village. It is a purely statistical concept, not defined by any municipal or county boundaries. Larger urban areas synonymous with cities or towns ( for both terms) for statistical purposes have a minimum of 10,000 inhabitants. The same statistical definition is also used for urban areas in the other Nordic countries.

In 2018, there were nearly two thousand urban areas in Sweden, which were inhabited by 87% of the Swedish population.

Urban area is a common English translation of the Swedish term . The official term in English used by Statistics Sweden is, however, "locality". It could be compared with "census-designated places" in the United States.

History
Until the beginning of the 20th century, only the towns/cities were regarded as urban areas. The built-up area and the municipal entity were normally almost congruent. Urbanization and industrialization created, however, many new settlements without formal city status. New suburbs grew up just outside city limits, being de facto urban but de jure rural. This created a statistical problem. The census of 1910 introduced the concept of "densely populated localities in the countryside". The term tätort (literally "dense place") was introduced in 1930. The municipal amalgamations placed more and more  rural areas within city municipalities, which was the other side of the same problem. The administrative boundaries were in fact not suitable for defining rural and urban populations. From 1950 rural and urban areas had to be separated even within city limits, as, e.g., the huge wilderness around Kiruna had been declared a "city" in 1948. From 1965 only "non-administrative localities" are counted, independently of municipal and county borders. In 1971 "city" was abolished as a type of municipality.

Terminology

Urban areas in the meaning of tätort are defined independently on the division into counties and municipalities, and are defined solely according to population density. In practice, most references in Sweden are to municipalities, not specifically to towns or cities, which complicates international comparisons. Most municipalities contain many localities (up to 26 in Kristianstad Municipality), but some localities are, on the other hand, multimunicipal. Stockholm urban area is spread over 11 municipalities.

When comparing the population of different cities, the urban area (tätort) population is to prefer ahead of the population of the municipality. The population of, e.g., Stockholm should be accounted as about 1.2 million rather than the approximately 800,000 of the municipality, and Lund rather about 75,000 than about 110,000.

Swedish definitions

Terms used for statistical purposes

  is the central concept used in statistics. The definition is agreed upon in the Nordic countries: An urban area is any village, town or city with a population of at least 200, for which the contiguous built-up area meet the criterion that houses are not more than 200 meters apart when discounting rivers, parks, roads, etc. – without regard to the ward, municipal or county boundaries. Delimitation of localities are made by Statistics Sweden every three years starting 2015 on a trial basis, previously they were made every five years.
  is a rural locality with 50–199 inhabitants in a contiguous built-up area with no more than 150 meters between houses.
 Centralort is mostly used in the meaning municipal seat or municipal center of service, commerce and administration for an area.

Popular and traditional terms

 Storstad is a term usually reserved for Sweden's three largest cities: Stockholm, Gothenburg and Malmö. Statistics Sweden uses the term metropolitan area for these three cities and their immediate surroundings and municipalities.
 Stad is the term avoided by Statistics Sweden, however, it roughly corresponds to urban areas with a population greater than 10,000. Judicially, the term stad has been obsolete since 1971, and is now mostly used describing localities which used to be chartered towns. The statistical category "large town" used by Statistics Sweden include municipalities with more than 90,000 inhabitants within a 30 km radius from the municipality centre. There is also a category medelstor stad "middle large town".
 Köping was also abolished as an official term in 1971 in governmental and statistical contexts, and is only rarely kept in use by laymen, although it has survived as part of the names of several smaller towns. The meaning was a locality with an intermediary legal status below that of a town.
 Municipalsamhälle was a term in use between 1875 and 1971, but it is no longer used outside of historical contexts. In 1863, Sweden was divided into 2,500 municipalities, whereof 89 were towns, 8 were market towns (köpingar) and the rest rural municipalities ("landskommuner"). A "municipalsamhälle" was an administrative centre for one or several rural municipalities, with special regulations and privileges in common with towns. The term became obsolete in 1971 when the different types of municipalities were abandoned and a standard form for all municipalities was introduced.
 Samhälle is a common concept used by for urban areas that are intermediary in size between a town and a village. The term "samhälle" is also used in Swedish to denote "society", "community" or "state". (Compare: Gemeinschaft and Gesellschaft.) A samhälle does not necessarily meet the criteria for the current tätort – or even småort concept.
 By is a traditional term but may in colloquial use refer to a suburb or town of considerable size. If at all used in the context of statistics, it must be assumed that the size of a by is smaller than that of a småort. (NB! Not to be confused with the same word in Danish and Norwegian, where it means town, while a village is called landsby.)

Seasonal areas and suburbs
 Fritidshusområde is in statistical context an area with less than 50 permanent inhabitants but at least 50 houses (in practice: weekend cottages/summer houses) meeting the criterion that they are not more than 150 metres apart. About a third of Sweden's "second homes" are located in such areas. The term belongs also to everyday usage, although less strictly defined.
 Förstad and förort are much used terms with a somewhat negative connotation.

Statistics

Before 2015 delimitation of localities were made by Statistics Sweden every five years, since then it is trialling a three-year update period. The number of urban areas in Sweden increased by 56 to 1,956 in 2010. A total of 8,016,000 – 85 per cent – of the Swedish population lived in an urban area; occupying only 1,3 per cent of Sweden's total land area, and the most populous urban area is Stockholm at 1,4 million people.

See also
Urban areas in the Nordic countries
List of urban areas in the Nordic countries
List of cities in Sweden
List of metropolitan areas in Sweden
List of municipalities of Sweden
List of urban areas in Sweden
Largest urban areas of the European Union
Geography of Sweden
Chumbus (disambiguation)

References

External links
Statistics Sweden (Swedish)

 
Types of administrative division
 
Demographics of Sweden